After World War I, the city of Fiume (now Rijeka, Croatia) was claimed by both the Kingdom of Serbs, Croats and Slovenes and Italy. While its status was unresolved, its postal system was operated by a variety of occupation forces and local governments.

Allied Occupation 

An international force of British and French troops took over the city between 17 November 1918 and 12 September 1919.

The first postage stamps for Fiume were issued 1 December 1918 by the Italian National Council which governed the city. They were produced by overprinting “FIUME” on the contemporary stamps of Hungary. Both handstamping and printing presses were used. In January 1919, two postage due and a savings bank stamp were surcharged as well. These stamps—even the most common values—were extensively forged. Serious collectors will require close examination of all stamps.

January also saw the first appearance of an issue produced specifically for Fiume. It consisted of 17 values, ranging from 2 centesimi to 10 corone, and used four designs: a figure representing “Italy”, the town clock tower with an Italian flag hanging from it, an allegory of “Revolution”, and a sailor raising the Italian flag. The first printings were inscribed just “FIUME”, while in July they were redesigned with the inscription “POSTA FIUME”, along with other minor changes. Meanwhile, a set of 12 semi-postal stamps was issued 18 May, commemorating the 200th day of peace since the end of the war. 

Later in 1919 the higher values were surcharged with lower values, and the semi-postals were overprinted “Valore globale” for use as regular stamps.

The Regency of Carnaro 
This confusing situation was exploited by the Italian poet Gabriele d'Annunzio, who entered the city on 12 September 1919 and began a 15-month period of occupation. On 8 September 1920, d'Annunzio established the Italian Regency of Carnaro in Fiume. On 12 September, 1920, the first anniversary of the city’s takeover by the forces of Gabriele d’Annunzio, the city government issued a series of 14 values featuring a portrait bust of d’Annunzio, intended for regular use. A set of four with various allegorical designs was issued, intended for the use of the legionnaires on that day only.

On 18 November, the set of four of 12 September were overprinted “ARBE” and “VEGLIA”, marking the occupation of the islands of Arbe and Veglia, and on 20 November, more were overprinted “Reggenza / Italiana / del / Carnaro” (Italian Regency of Carnaro), and with new values.

Free State of Fiume 

In January 1921, Italian troops put an end to d’Annunzio’s rule, and the subsequent provisional government overprinted the d’Annunzio heads with “Governo / Provvisorio”.

On 24 April 1921, the 1st constituent assembly of the Free State overprinted the semi-postals of 1919 with “24 - IV - 1921” and “Costituente Fiumana”. The following year the 2nd assembly added a “1922” to the overprints.

On 23 March, 1923 a new issue put an end to the flurry of overprints. Its 12 values, inscribed “Posta di Fiume”, used four designs, a Venetian sailing ship, a Roman arch, St. Vitus, and a rostral column, all printed over a buff-colored background. After the Treaty of Rome assigned Fiume to Italy (27 January), these stamps were overprinted “REGNO / D’ITALIA” (Kingdom of Italy) on 22 February and then “ANNESSIONE / ALL’ITALIA” (Annexation by Great-Italy) on 1 March. Subsequently Fiume used the stamps of Italy.

See also 
 Free State of Fiume

References and Sources

 Stanley Gibbons Ltd: various catalogues
 Encyclopaedia of Postal Authorities
 Rossiter, Stuart & John Flower. The Stamp Atlas. London: Macdonald, 1986. 
 Scott catalog

Further reading
 Antoniazzo, Vincenzo and Umberto Riccotti. Catalogo Storico-descrittivo dei Francobolli di Fiume. Pavia: Giorgio Migliavacca, 1981  69p. Reprint of a catalogue from 1923.
 Dehn, Roy A. The Stamps and Postal History of Fiume 1600-1924. Norwich: R. Dehn, 1998  120p.
 Gilbert, J. F. The Postmarks of Fiume 1809-1945. Teddington: Italy and Colonies Study Circle, 2007 162p. Series Title: Fil-italia handbooks; no. 4.
 Gilbert, J. F. Postmarks of the Province of Fiume 1924-1943, Including Precursors. Teddington: Italy and Colonies Study Circle, 2009 134p. Series Title: Fil-italia handbooks; no.7.
 Grgurić, Mladen, and Melita Sciucca. Riječke Marke: Fiume: 1918-1924. Rijeka: Muzej grada Rijeke, 2002 90p.
 Martinas, Ivan. The Stamps of Rijeka, Fiume 1918-1924 = Postanske Marke Rijeke, Fiume 1918-1924. Zagreb: OBOL-naklada, 2006  250p.
 Oliva, Guglielmo. Razionale Catalogazione dei Francobolli di Fiume conprezzi Indicativi del Mercato Italiano. Genova: Rivista filatelica d'Italia, 1956 56p.
 Ore, Tønnes. Indeficienter: The Story of Fiume to 1918. Earlston: The Yugoslavia Study Group, 2010 Series Title: Jugoposta Monographs; no. 8.

History of Rijeka
Philately of Italy
Philately of Croatia
Philately of Hungary
Philately of Yugoslavia
Culture in Rijeka